Cégep de Victoriaville is a post-secondary institution (CEGEP, or junior college) in Victoriaville, Quebec, Canada.

History
The college traces its origins to the merger of several institutions which became public ones in 1967, when the Quebec system of CEGEPs was created.

Programs
The CEGEP offers two types of programs: pre-university and technical. The pre-university programs, which take two years to complete, cover the subject matters which roughly correspond to the additional year of high school given elsewhere in Canada in preparation for a chosen field in university. The technical programs, which take three-years to complete, applies to students who wish to pursue a skill trade.

It was created in 1969 from the merger of a classical college ("collège classique" in French), Collège Sacré-Cœur, and the École du meuble et du bois ouvré (Furniture and woodworking school). The furniture and woodworking school is now known as the École nationale du meuble et de l'ébénisterie.

See also
List of colleges in Quebec
Higher education in Quebec

References

External links
Cégep de Victoriaville (French)

Victoriaville
Victoriaville
Buildings and structures in Centre-du-Québec
Education in Centre-du-Québec